Frans Tebak (20 September 1927 – 8 August 2002) was a Dutch footballer. He played in ten matches for the Netherlands national football team from 1952 to 1954.

References

External links
 

1927 births
2002 deaths
Dutch footballers
Netherlands international footballers
Association footballers not categorized by position